The following lists events that happened during 1986 in Cape Verde.

Incumbents
President: Aristides Pereira
Prime Minister: Pedro Pires

Events
Jardim Botânico Nacional Grandvaux Barbosa, Cape Verde's only botanical garden created

Births
January 11: Djô, footballer
February 23: Sidnei, footballer
April 2: Tuga, footballer
April 14: David Renato Cruz Coronel, nickname: Bijou, footballer
April 16: Platini (Cape Verdean footballer)
June 3: Josimar Dias, later Vozinha, footballer
June 13: Toni Varela, footballer
July 14: Osvaldo Tavares Oliveira, later Figo, footballer
July 20: Patas, footballer
August 9: Wania Monteiro, athlete
September 2: Gélson Fernandes, footballer
November 17: Nani, footballer
December 4: Aires Marques, or Alex, footballer

References

 
Years of the 20th century in Cape Verde
1980s in Cape Verde
Cape Verde
Cape Verde